Bang Phae is a district (amphoe) in the eastern part of Ratchaburi province, western Thailand.

History
The district was created in the year 1914 from 17 tambons from the districts Ban Pong, Photharam, and Damnoen Saduak. At first a temporary district office was located in a pavilion of Wat Hua Pho in tambon Hua Pho. Originally named Lam Phraya (ลำพระยา), it was renamed Hua Pho in 1917. In 1939 it was renamed Bang Phae, following the location of the district office since 1918.

Geography
Neighbouring districts are (from the south clockwise), Damnoen Saduak and Photharam of Ratchaburi Province; Mueang Nakhon Pathom and Sam Phran of Nakhon Pathom province; and Ban Phaeo of Samut Sakhon province.

Administration
The district is divided into seven sub-districts (tambons), which are further subdivided into 65 villages (mubans). There are two sub-district municipalities (thesaban tambons). Bang Phae covers tambons Bang Phae and Wang Yen, and Pho Hak the tambon Pho Hak. There are a further four tambon administrative organizations (TAO).

State of society
Bang Phae is a small and quiet town. There is a lot of provincial conditions. The number of crimes is very small, and it is said that even if you forget appliance or leave the car overnight, it will not be stolen.

Economy
Bang Phae is considered the largest giant freshwater prawn (domestically known as river prawn, or indigo claws prawn) farming site in the country. Because it is a watershed source that receives water released from the Srinakarin Dam in Kanchanaburi province in the upper part.

References

External links
 amphoe.com (Thai)
 Bang Phae district history (Offline)

Bang Phae